Silene caucasica is a species of flowering plant in the family Caryophyllaceae. It is native to Transcaucasia and Turkey.

References

Sources
Nersesian, A. A., Goukasian, A.G. - On the karyology of the representatives of the genus Silene L. s. l. (Caryophyllaceae) from southern Transcaucasia. – Publ. in Flora Orientalis 1: 622. 1867.
Biolib
Tropicos
Euromed

caucasica
Taxa named by Alexander von Bunge
Taxa named by Pierre Edmond Boissier
Flora of Turkey
Flora of the Transcaucasus